James Benjamin Redfoord Bulwer MA, QC, JP (22 May 1820 – 4 March 1899) was an English lawyer and a Member of the British Parliament. He was also a cricketer, and played seven first-class matches for Cambridge University Cricket Club and the Marylebone Cricket Club between 1841 and 1845.

Bulwer was an MP supporting the Conservative Party: he represented Ipswich during the period of the Disraeli government from 1874 to 1880, and Cambridgeshire from 1881 to 1885.

References

External links 
 
 

1820 births
1899 deaths
Politicians from County Dublin
Conservative Party (UK) MPs for English constituencies
UK MPs 1874–1880
UK MPs 1880–1885
Members of the Parliament of the United Kingdom for Ipswich
Cambridge University cricketers
Marylebone Cricket Club cricketers
Alumni of Trinity College, Cambridge
English cricketers